Karl DeWitt Warner (June 23, 1908 – September 5, 1995) was an American athlete, winner of a gold medal in 4x400 m relay at the 1932 Summer Olympics.

At the Los Angeles Olympics, Warner ran the third leg in the American 4x400 m relay team, which won the gold medal with a new world record of 3.08.2.

Warner died in Rochester, New York, aged 87.

References

American male sprinters
1908 births
1995 deaths
Athletes (track and field) at the 1932 Summer Olympics
Olympic gold medalists for the United States in track and field
Medalists at the 1932 Summer Olympics